King Edward Technical College is a former school and technical college in Dunedin, New Zealand. The college was established in 1889 as the Dunedin Technical School when the Caledonian Society instigated night education classes.

Through the 1960s and 70s, the school was split up and became Otago Polytechnic and Logan Park High School.

History
In 1893 the Dunedin Technical School was established by the Dunedin Technical Association at property leased on Great King Street. The school offered classes in carpentry, chemistry, cookery, domestic economy, typewriting, and woodcarving, with courses expanded in 1895 and 1896 to include dressmaking, navigation, and plumbing. 

In July 1897 the school moved to the Anderson and Morrison Brass Foundry on Moray Place. In 1903, following financial difficulties, the Otago Education Board was given control of the school and a new board of managers was instituted. Evening classes were also ceased. 

In 1910 a new structure in Upper Stuart Street was planned, and in 1914 the school's new premises were officially opened. It was at this point that the school changed its name to honour the late King Edward VII. In 1921 control of the Dunedin School of Art was transferred to the Technical School's Board. The college's first principal was Angus Marshall.

By 1955, the school was the largest in the country, with a total roll of 2,500 (half of them in day classes) and over 250 classes. By this time, the college included a day school, the Dunedin Technical High School, the Dunedin School of Art, Senior School of Commerce, and an Evening School. 

In February 1966, the tertiary arm of the college officially adopted the name Otago Polytechnic and eventually moved to a new site, initially in York Place, close to the Upper Stuart Street site, but later moved to Union Street, close to the University of Otago. Since 1975, the secondary component has been located on a new site close to the Polytechnic, renamed as Logan Park High School.

Legacy
The prominent, old King Edward Technical College buildings on Stuart Street are now known as King Edward Court. The main building, designed by Harry Mandeno as his first commission, has a Category I listing with Heritage New Zealand, registration number 4712.

Dunedin association football team Dunedin Technical was formed by alumni of the institution, and was originally known as King Edward Technical College Old Boys.

Current building use
The building has been repurposed as a site for small businesses. There are several retailers on the ground floor, and other spaces are used for art, dance, and martial art classes.

Notable academics and staff 

 Vernon Griffiths

Notable alumni

The Arts 
Alumni of the Otago School of Art and Design that became part of Otago Polytechnic
 Ralph Hotere
 Colin McCahon
 Toss Woollaston

Sport  
 John Hore – All Black
 Keith Murdoch – All Black 
 Joe Procter – All Black
 Duncan Robertson – All Black
 Charlie Sonntag – All Black

Science
 Joseph William Mellor

References

Secondary schools in Dunedin
Educational institutions established in 1889
Defunct universities and colleges in New Zealand
Heritage New Zealand Category 1 historic places in Otago
Otago Polytechnic
1880s in Dunedin
Harry Mandeno buildings
1889 establishments in New Zealand
Central Dunedin